Augustine Omole (1955–April 2021) was an Anglican bishop in Nigeria who served as the Bishop of Sokoto, one of ten dioceses within the Anglican Province of Kaduna, itself one of 14 provinces within the Church of Nigeria.

Death
Omole died in April 2021 at the age of 66 due to injuries from a vehicle accident.

Notes

Anglican bishops of Sokoto
21st-century Anglican bishops in Nigeria